Patricio Samper Gnecco (1 November 1930 – 5 January 2006) was a Colombia architect, urbanist and politician. A former Ambassador of Colombia to Israel and former Ambassador of Colombia to Bulgaria, he also served as Councilman for Bogotá from 1980 until 1990.

Personal life
Patricio was born on 1 November 1930 in Bogotá to Santiago Samper Ortega descendant of the O'Donnell dynasty and Blanca Gnecco Fallón. He married Beatriz Elvira Salazar Camacho with whom he had eight children, Santiago, Jerónimo, Ana María, Mónica, Fernando, Arturo, Paula, and Guillermo; they later separated. He later remarried to Genoveva Carrasco with whom he had two children, Estefanía and Simón. After the death of his second wife in 1995, he remarried to Maria José de F Rodrigues who survived him after his death on 5 January 2006 in Bogotá. He was a cousin of Ernesto Samper Pizano

References

1930 births
2006 deaths
People from Bogotá
Patricio
National University of Colombia alumni
Colombian architects
Colombian urban planners
Ambassadors of Colombia to Bulgaria
Ambassadors of Colombia to Israel